The 2021–22 season was the 134th season in the existence of Sparta Rotterdam and the club's third consecutive season in the top flight of Dutch football. In addition to the domestic league, Sparta Rotterdam participated in this season's edition of the KNVB Cup.

Players

First-team squad

Reserve squad

Players out on loan

Transfers

In

Out

Pre-season and friendlies

Competitions

Overall record

Eredivisie

League table

Results summary

Results by round

Matches
The league fixtures were announced on 11 June 2021.

KNVB Cup

Statistics

Green is going on a call with my friend who has a soccer ball and a new team with a team of players 
The list is sorted by shirt number when total goals are equal.

References

Sparta Rotterdam seasons
Sparta Rotterdam